Neato may refer to:
 Neato (spider), a genus of spider 
 The  command line tool, part of the Graphviz software package
 Neato Robotics, manufacturer of robotic vacuum cleaners
 Northeast Asia Treaty Organization, the proposed military alliance organization